Edna & Harvey may refer to either of two computer games running on Microsoft Windows:

Edna & Harvey: The Breakout (2008)
Edna & Harvey: Harvey's New Eyes (2012)